Lin Wan-i is a Taiwanese academic and minister without portfolio of the Executive Yuan, having taken office on 20 May 2016.

Education
Lin obtained his bachelor's and master's degrees in sociology from National Taiwan University in 1979 and 1981, respectively, and doctoral degree in social welfare from the University of California, Berkeley in the United States.

Career
Lin held multiple academic positions in the departments of sociology and social work at National Taiwan University from 1982 to the present. He served as a minister without portfolio under the Executive Yuan from 2006 to 2007 and again from 2016 to the present.

References

1952 births
Living people
Political office-holders in the Republic of China on Taiwan
Politicians of the Republic of China on Taiwan from New Taipei